The 2023 Missouri Valley Conference Men's Basketball Tournament, popularly referred to as "Arch Madness", was a postseason men's basketball tournament that completed the 2022–23 season in the Missouri Valley Conference. The tournament was held at the Enterprise Center in St. Louis, Missouri from March 2–5, 2023.

For the first time, the tournament featured 12 teams. Belmont, Murray State, and UIC joined the conference in 2022 following Loyola Chicago's exit.

Seeds 
Teams are seeded by conference record, with ties broken by the overall record in conference games played between the tied teams, then (if necessary) by comparison of records between the tying institutions versus the top team in the standings (and continuing from top to bottom of standings, as necessary, with the team having the better record against that team receiving the better seed). The top four seeds receive openinground byes.

Schedule

Bracket

References 

Missouri Valley Conference men's basketball tournament
Basketball competitions in St. Louis
2022–23 Missouri Valley Conference men's basketball season
College basketball tournaments in Missouri
Missouri Valley Conference men's basketball tournament
Missouri Valley Conference men's basketball tournament